Zoltán Bíró (born 21 April 1941) is a Hungarian literary historian, writer and politician who served as the first president of the Hungarian Democratic Forum. He quit the party in 1991 and became founding member of the National Democratic Alliance. He served as co-chairman of the new party along with Imre Pozsgay.

Works
 Vállalások és kételyek. Esszék, tanulmányok (Szépirodalmi Könyvkiadó, 1987)
 Saját út. A népi írók magyar jövőképe 1945–1949 (Eötvös Kiadó, 1988)
 Októberi kérdések (Püski-Eötvös, 1988)
 Kizárt a párt (társszerző, 1989)
 Egy év után, választás előtt. Beszélgetések Pozsgay Imrével (Püski Kiadó, 1990)
 Elhervadt forradalom (Püski Kiadó, 1993)
 Ady Endre sorsköltészete (Püski Kiadó, 1998)
 Saját út (1998)
 Két nemzedék. A magyar irodalom két nagy nemzedéke a 20. században (Nemzeti Tankönyvkiadó, 2001)

References
 Hermann Péter: Ki kicsoda 2002 CD-ROM, Biográf Kiadó 
 Nemzeti Fórum
 Magyar Hírlap
 Tudományos életrajza

1941 births
Living people
Writers from Budapest
20th-century Hungarian historians
Hungarian Democratic Forum politicians